Asprocottus pulcher is a species of ray-finned fish belonging to the family Cottidae, the typical sculpins. It was described by Dmitrii Nikolaevich Taliev in 1955. It is a freshwater fish which is endemic to Lake Baikal, Russia. It is known to dwell at a depth range of 50–250 metres.

References

pulcher
Fish described in 1955
Taxa named by Dmitrii Nikolaevich Taliev
Fish of Lake Baikal